Ilya Vladimirovich Nikulin (born 12 March 1982) is a Russian former professional ice hockey defenceman. He played for HC Dynamo Moscow and Ak Bars Kazan in the Kontinental Hockey League (KHL). Nikulin was drafted by the Atlanta Thrashers in the second round, 31st overall in the 2000 NHL Entry Draft.

Playing career
Later that year, Nikulin began his professional career in the Russian Superleague (RSL) with Dynamo Moscow. He played with Dynamo for five seasons. In 2005, he joined Ak Bars Kazan. His five-year contract with Kazan included allowing him to leave for the NHL. However, after negotiations in 2008 and 2009, Nikulin did not sign a contract with the Thrashers.

On 15 July 2020, Nikulin officially announced his retirement from professional hockey, ending a 19-year career.

International play
Nikulin has played for Team Russia. He competed at the 1999 under-18 Championship, earned a silver medal at the 2000 World Junior Championship, a bronze at the 2007 World Championship, a silver at the 2010 World Championship and a gold at the 2008, 2009 and 2012 IIHF World Championships. He was selected to the 2010 Russian Olympic team.

Personal
Nikulin is good friends with Alexander Ovechkin, with whom he played four seasons with during his tenure with Dynamo Moscow. He is also the godfather of Nikulin's son.

Career statistics

Regular season and playoffs

International

References

External links

1982 births
Living people
Ak Bars Kazan players
Atlanta Thrashers draft picks
HC Dynamo Moscow players
Ice hockey players at the 2010 Winter Olympics
Ice hockey players at the 2014 Winter Olympics
Olympic ice hockey players of Russia
Russian ice hockey defencemen
Ice hockey people from Moscow